The following is a complete list of honorary (also known as honoris causa) doctorates issued by the University of New Zealand before it was disestablished in 1961 and its constituent colleges raised to full university status. It does not include normal doctorates of the same name which were awarded over the same period.

References

New Zealand
Lists of New Zealand people by school affiliation
University of New Zealand alumni
New Zealand education-related lists